William Monroe Igou (September 28, 1872 – 1933) was a businessman, county commissioner, state legislator, and served as Florida Secretary of State in 1929 and 1930.

He was born in Georgia and moved to Florida at age 21. He married Annie Netherland. His photograph appeared in a composite with those of other 1915 Florida state senators.

References

Florida state senators
Secretaries of State of Florida
1872 births
1933 deaths